The 2nd Grand Prix de Paris was a Formula One motor race held on 30 May 1948 at the Autodrome de Linas-Montlhéry, in Montlhéry near Paris.

The 50-lap race was won by Talbot-Lago driver Yves Giraud-Cabantous, who also set fastest lap. Louis Chiron drove another Talbot-Lago for second place and Eugene Chaboud was third in a Delahaye.

Results

References

Paris